Harold B. Rudisill (May 14, 1898 – May 18, 1969) was a Democratic member of the Pennsylvania House of Representatives.

References

Democratic Party members of the Pennsylvania House of Representatives
1969 deaths
1898 births
20th-century American politicians